Lloydminster is a former provincial electoral district  for the Legislative Assembly of the province of Saskatchewan, Canada. This constituency was created before the 2nd Saskatchewan general election in 1908. Abolished in 1934, the riding was incorporated into the district of Cut Knife.

This constituency was reconstituted for the 23rd Saskatchewan general election in 1995.

Members of the Legislative Assembly

Election results

|-

|Provincial Rights
|Henry Robert Miles
|align="right"|644
|align="right"|48.64%
|align="right"|–
|- bgcolor="white"
!align="left" colspan=3|Total
!align="right"|1,324
!align="right"|100.00%
!align="right"|

|-

|Conservative
|Oscar H. Price
|align="right"|517
|align="right"|33.90%
|align="right"|-14.74

|Independent
|Ambrose H. Longton
|align="right"|402
|align="right"|26.36%
|align="right"|–
|- bgcolor="white"
!align="left" colspan=3|Total
!align="right"|1,525
!align="right"|100.00%
!align="right"|

|-

|Conservative
|James A. Hill
|align="right"|845
|align="right"|40.20%
|align="right"|+6.30
|- bgcolor="white"
!align="left" colspan=3|Total
!align="right"|2,102
!align="right"|100.00%
!align="right"|

|-

|- bgcolor="white"
!align="left" colspan=3|Total
!align="right"|Acclamation
!align="right"|

|-

|- bgcolor="white"
!align="left" colspan=3|Total
!align="right"|1,716
!align="right"|100.00%
!align="right"|

|-

|Conservative
|James Hetherington
|align="right"|949
|align="right"|27.41%
|align="right"|-
|- bgcolor="white"
!align="left" colspan=3|Total
!align="right"|3,462
!align="right"|100.00%
!align="right"|

See also
Electoral district (Canada)
List of Saskatchewan provincial electoral districts
List of Saskatchewan general elections
List of political parties in Saskatchewan

References
 Saskatchewan Archives Board – Saskatchewan Election Results By Electoral Division

Former provincial electoral districts of Saskatchewan